Edgar Pettman (1866–1943) was an English organist, choral conductor and music editor. Born in Dunkirk, Kent, in 1881 he entered the Royal Academy of Music where he studied under George Alexander Macfarren. He was organist at a number of London churches, including St Mary's, Kilburn and St James's Church, Piccadilly until his retirement in 1924. Although the composer of a number of anthems and other church music, he is best known for his 1892 book Modern Christmas Carols. Pettman harmonized the now popular carols I Saw a Maiden and Gabriel's Message, both based on Basque carol melodies, publishing the latter in a pamphlet, The University Carol book, in 1922 with an English rendering by Sabine Baring-Gould.  He was also an early editor of the works of Thomas Tallis, publishing an edition in 1900.

References

1866 births
1943 deaths
English composers
English classical organists
British male organists
Alumni of the Royal Academy of Music
People from Faversham
Musicians from Kent
Male classical organists